Sir James Mitchell National Park is a national park in the South West region of Western Australia, 284 km south of Perth.

References

See also
 Protected areas of Western Australia

National parks of Western Australia
Protected areas established in 1969
James Mitchell (Australian politician)
Warren bioregion